The 2001–02 Australia Tri-Nation Series (more commonly as the 2001–02 VB Series) was a One Day International (ODI) cricket tri-series (14 matches) where Australia played host to New Zealand and South Africa. After drawing with New Zealand and defeating South Africa in the preceding Test series, Australia went into the tournament as favourites; however, they failed to reach the final; and captain Steve Waugh was consequently sacked as ODI captain, replaced by Ricky Ponting.

South African Jonty Rhodes, was the leading run-scorer for the series, while New Zealander Shane Bond was the leading wicket-taker.

Squads

Points Table

Points system 
Won = 4 points
Lost = 0 points
Tie or No result = 2 points
BP = Bonus points.
1 bonus point was awarded to the winning team if their run rate was 1.25x than that of the losing team.
Standard net run rate rules applied.
In the event of the teams finishing on equal points, the right to play in the final match (or series) will be determined as follows:
the team with the most number of wins
the team with the most number of wins over the other team(s).
the team with the highest number of bonus points
the team with the highest net run rate.

Group stage

1st match: Australia v New Zealand

2nd match: Australia v South Africa

3rd match: New Zealand v South Africa

4th match: Australia v New Zealand

5th match: New Zealand v South Africa

6th match: Australia v South Africa

7th match: Australia v South Africa

8th match: Australia v New Zealand

9th match: New Zealand v South Africa

10th Match: Australia v New Zealand

11th Match: New Zealand v South Africa

12th Match: Australia v South Africa

Australia needed a bonus point against South Africa to qualify for the finals. They lost the toss and were sent in to bat; however, they struggled early and were 7/195 in the 40th over, before Brett Lee scored 51 from 36 balls. Australia finished on 7/283, consequently needing to restrict South Africa to less than 227 to gain the bonus point. Nevertheless, it was not to be for the Australians, as Jacques Kallis compiled an unbeaten century (104), helping South Africa reach 227 with 16 balls to spare. They eventually finished on 250, and despite an Australian victory, the local team were out of the competition, upsetting many home fans. Australian captain Steve Waugh wrote:

Finals

1st final

South Africa continued their good form against New Zealand with a comfortable eight wicket win, set up by a strong bowling performance from Makhaya Ntini. Despite winning the toss and opting to bat, New Zealand lost both of their openers early, to Ntini. However a 109 wicket partnership between Stephen Fleming and Craig McMillan put the innings back on track. Once Lance Klusener dismissed the New Zealand captain for 50, they began to lose wickets regularly, with only Andre Adams making it into double figures. Ntini took the wicket of Adams to claim his second ODI five wicket haul and the innings was soon closed when Shane Bond was run-out by Jonty Rhodes. South Africa in reply lost their second wicket with 52 runs on the board but Boeta Dippenaar, who was dropped in the gully by Fleming on 40, and Jacques Kallis, guided South Africa to victory with 29 balls remaining.

2nd final

Having won the toss again, Stephen Fleming elected to bat first but once more New Zealand failed to produce a competitive total and South Africa chased it down comfortably. The New Zealanders, needing a win to force the finals series into a third match, had started their innings slowly and it wasn't until the fifth over that they scored their maiden run. An entertaining run a ball 43 from Lou Vincent got the team back on track but after he fell and Jacques Kallis dismissed Craig McMillan, New Zealand were struggling at 5/72. Although a 75 run partnership from Chris Cairns and Chris Harris looked like giving New Zealand a chance of posting over 200, the tail fell cheaply due to good bowling from Allan Donald. During their innings, the match had been reduced to 46 overs due to rain and the South Africans were thus chasing a revised target of 172. Herschelle Gibbs, despite losing his opening partner Gary Kirsten for just two runs, scored an aggressive 46 to give the South Africans a good platform. Jonty Rhodes brought up his half century and accumulated 16 runs in the 38th over, bowled by Andre Adams, before a pull to the boundary by Mark Boucher off Daniel Vettori the following over gave South Africa the title.

Aftermath
Australian cricket team captain Steve Waugh was dropped from the One Day International team after the conclusion of the series, and the captaincy role was assumed by Ricky Ponting. However, he continued the Test captaincy until his International retirement in January 2004, with Ponting becoming Australia's full-time captain.

Notes

References

External links
CricketArchive: VB Series 2001/02

VB Series
VB Series
VB
Australian Tri-Series
2002 in New Zealand cricket
2002 in South African cricket